Sándor Bíró (19 August 1911 – 7 October 1988) was a Hungarian international footballer who played as a defender.

He played for the Hungarian national team 54 times between 1932 and 1946, and he played in all four Hungarian matches in the 1938 FIFA World Cup, including the final against Italy.

Between July 1933 and June 1938 he played his club football for MTK Hungária. After the 1938 World Cup, he played in a friendly for Hungary against Scotland on 7 December 1938.

References

1911 births
1988 deaths
Hungarian footballers
Association football defenders
Hungary international footballers
1934 FIFA World Cup players
1938 FIFA World Cup players
MTK Budapest FC players
Burials at Farkasréti Cemetery
Sportspeople from Heves County